Mark Walton (born 1966) is an English male International lawn bowler.

Bowls career
Walton won three English National titles in 2004 and 2006 representing the Nafferton Bowls Club and Yorkshire. By winning the National singles title he represented England at the World Singles Champion of Champions event and won the 2005 gold medal in Christchurch, New Zealand defeating Dwayne Cameron of New Zealand in the final.

In 2004 and 2008, he won the Hong Kong International Bowls Classic singles and pairs titles.

References

1966 births
Living people
English male bowls players